IM Chung-Shik (Hangul: 임충식; Hanja: 任忠植; also translated YIM Chung Sik (April 23, 1922 - December 9, 1974) was a South Korean general and politician. His service started during the Korean War. His Bon-gwan is Jangheung.

Education 
Im's graduated from the Korea Military Academy (1st alumni) in 1946.  He graduated from the Republic of Korea Army Infantry School in 1949 and then after the Korean War graduated from the United States Army Field Artillery School in 1954. In 1956 Im graduated from the Republic of Korea Army College.  He completed further post secondary education at the Korea National Defense University with a Bachelor of Public Administration in 1958 and a Master of Public Administration in 1966.

Career 
At the beginning of Korean War in 1950 Im was the head of the 18th regiment (lieutenant colonel) for the Republic of Korea Army (South Korea).  He was promoted in 1952 to be division commander of the 7th Division.  After the war in 1954 Im became division commander for the ROK Army 2nd Division.
 
In 1960 he moved to the ROK Army Headquarters and in 1962 became the commander of the ROK Army 5th Corps.

In 1963 he joined the ROK Department of Defense office and in 1965 was elevated to Army Deputy Chief of Staff

He served as Chairman of the ROK Joint Chiefs of Staff from 1967.04 ~ 1968.08 and then as ROK Minister of National Defense from August 1968-March 1970

Im was a Member of Parliament (The 8th and 9th National Assembly)

Honors 
 ROK Order of Taegeuk Military Merit (1953)
 ROK Order of Ulchi Military Merit
 ROK Order of Chungmu Military Merit
 ROK Order of Hwarang Military Merit
 USA Silver Star (1950)
 USA Legion of Merit (1953)

References 

1922 births
1974 deaths
National Defense ministers of South Korea
Members of the National Assembly (South Korea)
South Korean expatriates in the United States
Chairmen of the Joint Chiefs of Staff (South Korea)